= Circocylliba =

Scientific classification
- Kingdom: Animalia
- Phylum: Arthropoda
- Class: Arachnida
- Subclass: Acari
- Order: Mesostigmata
- Family: Circocyllibamidae Sellnick, 1926
- Genus: Circocylliba Sellnick, 1926

Genus of mites

Circocylliba is a genus of mites in the order Mesostigmata, placed in its own family, Circocyllibamidae.

== Species ==
- Circocylliba camerata Sellnick, 1926
- Circocylliba dulcius Elzinga, 1994
- Circocylliba esenbecki Elzinga, 1994
